This is a list of players in the Australian Football League (AFL) who have either made their AFL debut or played for a new club during the 2019 AFL season. The season was notable in that Richmond's Marlion Pickett became the first player since 1952 to make his debut in an AFL Grand Final and the first since 1928 to win a premiership in his debut game.

Summary

AFL debuts

Change of AFL club

See also
List of AFL Women's debuts in 2019

References
Full listing of players who made their AFL or club debut in 2019

Australian rules football records and statistics
Australian rules football-related lists
Debut